The Boekel Building is a historic factory building located in the Old City neighborhood of Philadelphia, Pennsylvania at 505–515 Vine Street, west of North 5th Street. It was built in 1922–23, and is a six-story, reinforced concrete building clad in brick with terra cotta details. It features massive brick piers and broad banks of windows; the windows were replaced in 1992.

The building was added to the National Register of Historic Places in 2003.

See also
 
 National Register of Historic Places listings in Center City, Philadelphia

References
Notes

External links
 

Industrial buildings and structures on the National Register of Historic Places in Philadelphia
Industrial buildings completed in 1923
Old City, Philadelphia